The Transkei National Independence Party (TNIP) was a political party in the nominally independent South African homeland of Transkei. It was founded by the Matanzima brothers, Kaiser and George. The party advocated cooperation with the South African government. As of 1985, the leader of the party was George Matanzima. The party governed Transkei from 1976 until the 1987 coup d'état by Bantu Holomisa.

Electoral history 
 1973: TNIP won 25 out of 43 elected seats (a further 64 seats were filled by chiefs appointed ex-officio by the government)
 1976: TNIP won 69 out of 75 seats
 1981: TNIP won 74 out of 75 seats

References 

Defunct political parties in South Africa
Organisations associated with apartheid
Political parties with year of disestablishment missing
Political parties with year of establishment missing
Politics of Transkei